Darantasia rumolda is a moth of the subfamily Arctiinae first described by Schaus in 1924. It is found on Cuba.

References

Moths described in 1924
Nudariina
Endemic fauna of Cuba